The Star Awards for Best Programme Host is an award presented annually at the Star Awards, a ceremony that was established in 1994.

The category was introduced in 2016, at the 22nd Star Awards ceremony; Lee Teng received the award for his performance in Love on the Plate 3 and it is given in honour of a Mediacorp host who has delivered an outstanding performance in a variety show, info-ed or infotainment programme. The nominees are determined by a team of judges employed by Mediacorp; winners are selected by a majority vote from the entire judging panel.

The award combined the previous categories for Best Variety Show Host and Best Info-Ed Programme Host. The restructuring of these categories was a result of the award ceremony organising committee's wish to eliminate the distinctions between variety and info-ed programme hosting performances.

Since its inception, the award has been given to two hosts. Quan Yi Fong is the most recent winner in this category for her performance in Hear U Out 2. Since the ceremony held in 2022, Quan remains as the only host to win in this category five times. In addition, Quan has been nominated on eight occasions, more than any other host. Guo Liang holds the record for the most nominations without a win, with five.

Recipients

Nominees distribution chart

Award records

Multiple awards and nominations

The following individuals received two or more Best Programme Host awards:

The following individuals received two or more Best Programme Host nominations:

References 

Star Awards